Brian John Staskawicz ForMemRS is Professor of Plant and Microbial Biology at the University of California, Berkeley and scientific director of agricultural genomics at the Innovative Genomics Institute (IGI).

Education
Staskawicz   was educated at Bates College (BA, 1974), Yale University (MS, 1976) and the University of California, Berkeley where he completed a PhD in plant pathology in 1980.

Research and career
Staskawicz has made many seminal contributions to the understanding of infection strategies of plant pathogens and immune response of plants. These include the cloning of the first pathogen effector gene and the cloning and characterisation of one of the first plant NOD-like receptors.

Staskawicz and his colleagues also played a major role in establishing Arabidopsis thaliana as a model organism to study the molecular basis of microbial recognition by plants and genetically dissect defense signaling pathways. More recently, he is leading an effort at the IGI in the genome editing of agriculture crops for biotic and abiotic stress resistance and improved plant performance. Work in his laboratory has identified and characterised bacterial effector proteins from both Pseudomonas syringae and Xanthomonas spp.

Awards and honours
Staskawicz was elected a Foreign Member of the Royal Society (ForMemRS) in 2019. He is a member of the National Academy of Sciences of the US and has been elected a Fellow of both the American Phytopathological Society and the American Academy of Microbiology.

References

Living people
Foreign Members of the Royal Society
Members of the United States National Academy of Sciences
Year of birth missing (living people)